Handshakes With Snakes is the fifth studio album by American hip hop recording artist Apathy. It was released on June 10, 2016 through Dirty Version records. The album is entirely produced by Apathy.

Track listing
 Intro: An Army With Me... 00:24
 Pay Your Dues 03:38
 Amon RAW (feat. Celph Titled &  Pumpkinhead) 03:34
 Rap Is Not Pop 03:21
 Don't Touch That Dial (feat. Ras Kass & O.C.) 04:13
 Charlie Brown (feat. Oh No & Kappa Gamma) 03:57
 Blow Ya Head Off (feat. Marvalyss & Blacastan) 03:46
 Attention Deficit Disorder 02:33
 No Such Thing (feat. Spit Gemz & Nutso) 03:56
 Pieces of Eight (Give Up The Ship) 02:49
 Run For Your Life (feat. O.C.) 02:34
 Moses (feat. Twista & Bun B) 03:23
 Handshakes With Snakes (feat. Sick Jacken, B-Real & Mariagrazia) 04:12

References

External links

Demigodz Records albums
Apathy (rapper) albums
2016 albums